The  Phoenix Street drill hall is a former military installation in Lancaster, Lancashire.

History
The building was designed as the headquarters of the Lancaster Rifle Volunteers and completed in 1894. This unit evolved into the 5th Battalion the King's Own Royal Regiment (Lancaster) in 1908. The battalion was mobilised at the drill hall in August 1914 before being deployed to the Western Front. The battalion was redesignated the 4th/5th (Territorial) Battalion The King's Own Royal Regiment (Lancaster) at the drill hall in 1961. The battalion was reduced to a cadre in 1969 but reconstituted as the 4th (Territorial Army) Battalion of the King's Own Royal Border Regiment in 1975.
 
After the battalion moved to Alexandra Barracks at Caton Road in Lancaster in 1990, the drill hall was decommissioned and is now used as a church.

References

 

Drill halls in England
Buildings and structures in Lancaster, Lancashire